Parliamentary elections were held in Uganda on 27 June 1996, following the adoption of a new constitution in October 1995. The new constitution banned all political parties, so all members were elected as independents. The 276 seats  in the new Parliament were contested by 814 candidates, of which 156 were won by supporters of the National Resistance Movement. Voter turnout was 56%.

Results

References

Uganda
Parliamentary election
Ugandan parliamentary election
Elections in Uganda
Non-partisan elections